Yuri Petrovich Raizer (26 January 1927 – 25 June 2021) was a prominent Soviet and Russian theoretical physicist. 

Raizer was born in Kharkiv, USSR. He received his PhD degree in 1953 and his Doctor of Sciences degree in 1959. He was Senior Research Fellow at the Ishlinsky Institute for Problems in Mechanics of the Russian Academy of Sciences, Moscow, Russia where he served as a head of the Division of Physics of gas dynamic processes since 1965. Additionally, he was professor at the Moscow Institute of Physics and Technology since 1968.

Raizer worked in various fields including gas dynamics, low-temperature plasma, explosion physics, gas discharge physics, the interaction of laser radiation with ionized gas, and the physics of lightning. He wrote over 200 papers, eight books (six in English), and three patents. His "Physics of Shock Waves and High-Temperature Hydrodynamic Phenomena", co-authored with Yakov Zeldovich (in English, 1968, 2002), and "Gas Discharge Physics" (in English, 1991, 1997) are well known handbooks for researchers and students.

Bibliography 

Ya. B. Zel'dovich, Yu. P. Raizer. Physics of Shock Waves and High-Temperature Hydrodynamic Phenomena. Academic Press, New York, 1968; Dover Publications Inc. Mineola, New York, 2002.
Yu. P. Raizer. Laser-Induced Discharge Phenomena. Consultants Bureau, New York, London, 1977.
Yu. P. Raizer. Gas Discharge Physics. Springer, Berlin, New York, 1991, 1997.
Yu. P. Raizer, M. N. Shneider, and N. A. Yatsenko. Radio-Frequency Capacitive Discharges. CRC Press, Boca Raton, New York, 1995.
E. M.  Bazelyan, Yu. P. Raizer. Spark Discharge. CRC Press, Boca Raton, New York, 1998.
E. M. Bazelyan, Yu. P. Raizer. Lightning Physics and Lightning Protection. IOP Publishing, Bristol, Philadelphia, 2000.

References

Yu. P. Raizer papers in scientific journal "Physics-Uspekhi". http://ufn.ru/ru/authors/raizer_yurii_p/ (in Russian).
Yu. P.  Raizer. A nuclear explosion (paper). Great Soviet Encyclopedia,  3rd ed. M.: "The Soviet Encyclopedia", 1978 (in Russian).
Yu. P. Raizer. The shock wave (paper). Physical Encyclopedic Dictionary, M.: "The Soviet Encyclopedia", 1984, pp. 778–780 (in Russian).
 
Institute for Problems in Mechanics of the Russian Academy Sciences. Laboratory of Laser Discharges. http://www1.ipmnet.ru/lab10_en.htm

Soviet physicists
20th-century Russian physicists
21st-century Russian  physicists
Academic staff of the Moscow Institute of Physics and Technology
1927 births
2021 deaths
Scientists from Kharkiv
Lenin Prize winners
State Prize of the Russian Federation laureates
Peter the Great St. Petersburg Polytechnic University alumni